Nickelodeon Resorts by Marriott was a proposed Nickelodeon-themed multi-resort to be developed by Viacom (owner of Nickelodeon),  Miller Global Properties, LLC (resorts developer and owner - the company also owned Nickelodeon Suites Resort), and Marriott International (resort operator).

Planned opening
The first hotel was slated to open in 2010 at San Diego's Liberty Station. Six hundred fifty rooms were planned, a  water park, and some attractions. This was to be the first of 20 resorts to be under construction by 2020. The project was cancelled in 2009 amid the Great Recession. The fate of the remaining 19 hotels remains unclear in light of Marriott's current relationship with Nickelodeon, which is limited to hosting weekend getaways at existing resorts.

References

Resorts by Mariott
Marriott International brands
Defunct hotel chains
Tourist attractions in San Diego